Tireo is a town in the La Vega province of the Dominican Republic.

Sources 
 – World-Gazetteer.com

Populated places in La Vega Province